Aurangzeb Baloch (born 23 February 1991) is a Pakistani professional footballer who plays for Pakistan national football team and for the K-Electric F.C. He competed at the 2010 Asian Games as part of the Pakistani national football team.

References 

1991 births
Living people
Pakistani footballers
Pakistan international footballers
Association football midfielders
Footballers at the 2010 Asian Games
Asian Games competitors for Pakistan